Harry Lindley Hupp (April 5, 1929 – January 27, 2004) was a United States district judge of the United States District Court for the Central District of California.

Education and career
Born in Los Angeles, California, Hupp attended Beverly Hills High School. He also attended Pomona College from 1947 to 1950. He was in the United States Army from 1950 to 1952. He received an Artium Baccalaureus from Stanford University in 1953 and a Bachelor of Laws from Stanford Law School in 1955. He was in private practice in Los Angeles from 1955 to 1972, and was then a judge on the Superior Court, Los Angeles, California from 1972 to 1984.

Federal judicial service
On February 14, 1984, Hupp was nominated by President Ronald Reagan to a seat on the United States District Court for the Central District of California vacated by Judge A. Andrew Hauk. Hupp was confirmed by the United States Senate on March 20, 1984, and received his commission on March 21, 1984. He assumed senior status on April 1, 1997, serving in that capacity until his death of a massive stroke suffered at his home in San Gabriel, California, on January 27, 2004.

References

Sources

1929 births
2004 deaths
Beverly Hills High School alumni
California state court judges
Judges of the United States District Court for the Central District of California
Pomona College alumni
United States district court judges appointed by Ronald Reagan
20th-century American judges
Stanford Law School alumni
United States Army soldiers
Superior court judges in the United States